Lomas Verdes is an upper-middle-class neighborhood located in the north of Mexico City. The community was developed in the late 1960s and is near Ciudad Satélite (which was founded in 1957). Lomas Verdes means "Green Hills" in Spanish, as the terrain had a set of smooth hills covered with green grass and other wild vegetation, which nowadays are totally covered with houses.

The neighborhood consists of several sections: La Alteña I, II and III, La Soledad, Misiones, and the sections I, II, III, IV, V and the now in construction sección VI. To the North, Lomas Verdes borders the county of Atizapán de Zaragoza, to the south and the west with others neighborhoods of Naucalpan, and to the east with the ancient colonial town of Santa Cruz del Monte.

After its foundation Lomas Verdes was a so-called "bedroom community", as the majority of the residents commutes México City (7 miles far away) for work. Today, twenty years after founding, there are a strong commercial and services sector in the zone. The most important artery serving the area is the Súper Avenida Lomas Verdes, which connects the neighborhood with the Periferico and the elevated highway  that leads direct into the heart of Mexico City. As all Latin American urban developments the increasing growth of the population and the unplanned urban strategy overwhelmed the infrastructure and now traffic jams, accidents, air pollution and chaotic expansion have reduced the quality of the life of the inhabitants.

Education
The Colegio Alemán Alexander von Humboldt operates its Campus Norte/Campus Nord (formerly Campus Lomas Verdes) in this area. The kindergarten and primary levels occupy one building, and the secondary and preparatory levels occupy another building.

Colegio Cristóbal Colón is in Lomas Verdes.

There is also a Universidad del Valle de México (UVM) campus  and the elementary school Colegio Cristobal Colón.

References

External links
Ayuntamiento de Naucalpan de Juárez Official website
satelandia.com, restaurantes, bares, antros, gimnasios y más

Neighborhoods in the State of Mexico